Sidney Tushingham (1884–1968) was a painter and etcher who specialised in rustic scenes of villages and small-town life.

He was born in Burslem, Stoke-on-Trent, England, where he started  his artistic career as a china painter. He attended Burslem School of Art and progressed to the Royal College of Art. He worked as a vase painter at Royal Doulton in 1922 as he established his career as a society painter. He also became known for his etchings of pre-war Britain, Italy and Spain, and was a member of the Society of Graphic Art, where he exhibited in 1921.

He died in Haywards Heath, West Sussex in 1968.

External links
 Allison Gallery (two works)
 Child's Gallery (one work)

References 

1884 births
1968 deaths
Alumni of Burslem School of Art
Alumni of the Royal College of Art
20th-century English painters
English male painters
English etchers
People from Burslem
20th-century British printmakers
20th-century English male artists